'Mad' Arthur Smith (birth unknown – 17 December 1946) was an English rugby union and professional rugby league footballer who played in the 1900s and 1910s. He played club level rugby union (RU) for Yorkley RFC and Cinderford R.F.C., and representative level rugby league (RL) for Great Britain and England, and at club level for Oldham (Heritage No. 105) and Halifax (Heritage No. 234), as a forward (prior to the specialist positions of), during the era of contested scrums. He served in the First World War and was wounded by a German bullet.

Playing career

International honours
Arthur Smith won caps for England (RL) while at Oldham in 1906 against Other Nationalities, in 1908 against New Zealand, and Wales, in 1909 against Australia (3 matches), and won caps for Great Britain (RL) while at Oldham in 1908 against New Zealand (3 matches), and in 1908–09 against Australia (3 matches).

Championship final appearances
Arthur Smith played as a forward, i.e. number 12, in Oldham's 3–7 defeat by Wigan in the Championship Final during the 1908–09 season at The Willows, Salford on Saturday 1 May 1909.

Challenge Cup Final appearances
Arthur Smith played as a forward, i.e. number 10, in Oldham's 3–17 defeat by Warrington in the 1907 Challenge Cup Final during the 1906–07 season at Wheater's Field, Broughton, Salford on Saturday 27 April 1907 in front of a crowd of 18,500. and played as a forward, i.e. number 10, in the 5–8 defeat by Dewsbury in the 1912 Challenge Cup Final during the 1911–12 season at Headingley Rugby Stadium, Leeds on Saturday 27 April 1912 in front of a crowd of 16,000.

County Cup Final appearances
Arthur Smith played as a forward, i.e. number 12, in Oldham's 9–10 defeat by Wigan in the 1908 Lancashire County Cup Final during the 1908–09 season at Wheater's Field, Broughton, Salford on Saturday 19 December 1908.

Nickname
Smith's sobriquet of 'Mad' was due to his forceful and enthusiastic style of play.

References

External links
Statistics at orl-heritagetrust.org.uk

British military personnel of World War I
Cinderford R.F.C. players
England national rugby league team players
English rugby league players
English rugby union players
Footballers who switched code
Great Britain national rugby league team players
Halifax R.L.F.C. players
Oldham R.L.F.C. players
Place of birth missing
Place of death missing
Rugby league forwards
Year of birth missing
Year of death missing